SMS S18 was a V1-class torpedo boat of the Imperial German Navy. The ship was built by Schichau-Werke, at their Elbing shipyard, completing in 1912. S18 served with the German High Seas Fleet during the First World War, taking part in the Battle of Jutland in 1916. S18 survived the war, serving in the Weimar Republic's Reichsmarine. She was scrapped in 1935.

Construction and design
In 1911, the Imperial German Navy decided to break the pattern of each year's orders of torpedo boats being a development of the previous year's designs, as it felt that they were getting too big to work for the fleet, and instead the 12 torpedo boats (six each ordered from AG Vulcan and Germaniawerft) (the V1-class) were smaller than those ordered in recent years in order to be more manoeuvrable and so work better with the fleet. This change resulted in the numbering series for torpedo boats being restarted. The 1912 programme placed orders for a flotilla of 12 torpedo boats of similar design ( to ) with Schichau-Werke. The reduction in size resulted in the ships' seaworthiness being adversely affected, however, with the 1911 and 1912 torpedo boats acquiring the disparaging nickname "Admiral Lans' cripples".

S18s armament consisted of two  SK L/30 naval guns in single mounts fore and aft, together with four 50 cm (19.7 in) torpedo tubes with one reload torpedo carried. Up to 18 mines could be carried. The ship had a crew of 74 officers and other ranks. In 1916, the guns were replaced by more powerful 8.8 cm SK L/45 naval guns, and in 1917, these guns were again replaced, this time with 10.5 cm SK L/45 naval guns, while the ship's forecastle was lengthened.

S18, yard number 869, was launched at Schichau's shipyard in Elbing, East Prussia (now Elbląg in Poland) on 10 August 1912 and was commissioned on 12 January 1913.

Service
In May 1914, S18 was part of the 13th half-flotilla of the 7th Torpedo boat Flotilla.

First World War
S18 remained a member of the 13th half-flotilla of the 7th Flotilla, part of the German High Seas Fleet, at the outbreak of the First World War in August 1914. The 7th Torpedo Boat Flotilla supported the Raid on Yarmouth on 3 November 1914 and the Raid on Scarborough, Hartlepool and Whitby on 16 December 1914. The flotilla continued to support the High Seas Fleet in 1915, sortieing into the German Bight with the 5th and 9th Flotilla on 19/20 January and escorting a sortie of the fleet's battleships to off Terschelling on 29/30 March. S18, as part of the 7th flotilla, was part of the High Seas Fleet when it sailed to cover the Lowestoft Raid on 24–25 April 1916.

At the Battle of Jutland on 31 May–1 June 1916, S17 was still part of the 13th Half-flotilla of the 7th Torpedo boat flotilla, operating in support of the main German battle fleet. During the night action, the 7th flotilla was ordered to search for and attack the British fleet, being allocated the sector to the south-east of the German fleet. As the British fleet had a night cruising speed of 17 knots, this would limit the 7th Flotilla's effectiveness. At about 23:00 hr CET (i.e. 22:00 hr GMT) on the night of 31 May/1 June, there was a brief confrontation between the 7th Torpedo Boat flotilla and the British 4th Destroyer Flotilla. Four German torpedo boats, including S16, each fired one torpedo at the British destroyers, while the British ships replied with gunfire, but no ships were damaged and contact was soon lost, although the two formations met again at about 23:42 CET (22:42 GMT) when  fired another torpedo, which also missed. S18 then helped to escort the battlecruiser  back to port.

In February 1917, S18 was one of ten torpedo boats transferred to the German naval forces based in Flanders, arriving in Belgium on the 18th of that month, joining the 2nd Zeebrugge half-flotilla. The attack was ineffective, with no shipping encountered. A second attack on the Channel was launched on the night of 17/18 March 1917, with the 2nd Zeebrugge half-flotilla  being assigned to attack shipping in the Downs. Only a single merchant ship, the steamer , which was suffering from engine problems was anchored in the Downs.  sank  Greypoint with a torpedo while S18 shelled Margate.

On the night of 3/4 September 1917, S18 was damaged in a British air raid on Zeebrugge. Later that year, S18 was transferred to an escort flotilla, and on 17 November 1917, she was part of the escort for German battleships during the Second Battle of Heligoland Bight. and at the end of the war was still a member of the 1st half-flotilla of the 1st Escort Flotilla.

Postwar operations
S18 was one of the 12 destroyers and 12 torpedo boats  that the Weimar Republic's Reichsmarine was allowed to retain under the Treaty of Versailles. She was recommissioned on 25 May 1921, serving in the Baltic Sea. S18 was stricken on 31 May 1931, and scrapped at Wilhelmshaven in 1935.

Notes

References

Bibliography
 
 
 
 
 
 
 
 
 

 

Torpedo boats of the Imperial German Navy
1912 ships
World War I torpedo boats of Germany
V1-class destroyers